Mario Macea  (born January 27, 1982) is a Colombian defender who plays for Atlético Junior in the Copa Mustang.

References

External links

1982 births
Living people
Colombian footballers
Atlético Junior footballers
Deportivo Pereira footballers
Association football defenders
People from Montería